Sara Palmas (born 7 July 1977) is a former Italian female middle and long-distance runner who competed at one edition of the IAAF World Cross Country Championships at senior level (2001).

Biography
She won silver medal with the national team at the World Military Cross Country Championships held in 2006 in Tunis and 12 national championships at senior level. She also finished top 8 in a competition at the highest level outside of the Olympic games and world championships, more precisely at the European Athletics Indoor Championships individual events, she was 7th at the 2002 European Athletics Indoor Championships held in Vienna in the 1500 metres.

Achievements

National titles
Italian Athletics Championships
1500 m: 2001, 2002, 2003 (3)
Cross country running (short race): 2001 (1)
Italian Athletics Indoor Championships
800 m: 1999, 2001 (2)
1500 m: 2000, 2001, 2002, 2005, 2007, 2011 (6)

References

External links
 

1977 births
Living people
Italian female middle-distance runners
Italian female long-distance runners
Athletics competitors of Gruppo Sportivo Esercito